Poul Holmskov Schlüter (3 April 1929 – 27 May 2021) was a Danish politician who served as Prime Minister of Denmark from 1982 to 1993. He was the first member of the Conservative People's Party to become Prime Minister, as well as the first conservative to hold the office since 1901.  Schlüter was a member of the Folketing (Danish parliament) for the Conservative People's Party from 1964 to 1994. He was also Chairman of the Conservative People's Party from 1974 to 1977 and from 1981 to 1993.

Early life
Born in Tønder, south Jutland, he graduated from the University of Copenhagen in 1957 with a degree in law, and joined the bar in 1960.

Political career

In 1964, Schlüter was elected to the Folketing for the Conservative People's Party. He was elected leader of the Conservatives from 1974, defeating Erik Ninn-Hansen. Though he lost the position in 1977, he regained it two years later. 

In 1982, after Prime Minister Anker Jørgensen was forced to resign, Schlüter constructed a four-party coalition and was appointed his successor. During his time as Prime Minister, he was named "Nordic Politician of the Year" (in 1984). He was subsequently granted a large number of Danish and international awards and medals.

Previously, he had served as a member of the Council of Europe from 1971 to 1974, and had headed the Danish Delegation to the Nordic Council, where he served as a member of the Council Presidium, in 1978 and 1979. He retired as Prime Minister in 1993 after an inquiry found that he had misinformed the Danish Parliament. The case was known as the Tamil Case, as it involved asylum requests from Tamil refugees.

When Schlüter resigned in 1993, he attempted to have Uffe Ellemann Jensen (Venstre) appointed acting prime minister until the Conservative Henning Dyremose could take over. The attempt was dropped as royal cabinet secretary Niels Eilschou Holm considered the maneuver unconstitutional. Instead, Poul Nyrup Rasmussen (Social Democrats) was appointed prime minister following a "Queen's round".

Following his retirement as Prime Minister in 1993, Schlüter served as a member of the European Parliament from 1994 to 1999, the first three years as Vice-President of the body.

Other ventures
In 2003, Schlüter was appointed by the Swedish Minister of Co-operation as her special envoy to promote freedom of movement in the Nordic countries. Schlüter was to work on ways of increasing individual freedom of movement and present specific proposals to the Nordic Council Session in October 2003.

In 2004, Schlüter co-founded the first Danish free-market think tank CEPOS, and gave the opening speech at CEPOS' opening reception at the Hotel D'Angleterre in Copenhagen.

Personal life
Schlüter was married three times. On 16 March 1963, he married Majken Steen-Andersen, but the couple divorced in 1978. Their only child, Peter, was born in 1963. Schlüter then married Lisbeth Povelsen on 20 September 1979. She died during her husband's premiership on 17 February 1988.

On 21 July 1989, while still prime minister, Schlüter married the Danish ballet dancer Anne Marie Vessel as his third wife.

Honours

National honours
 : Knight Grand Cross of the Order of the Dannebrog

Foreign honours
 : Knight Grand Cross of the Order of the Oak Crown
 : Knight Grand Cross of the Royal Order of the Polar Star

Bibliography

References

Further reading
 Wilsford, David, ed. Political leaders of contemporary Western Europe: a biographical dictionary (Greenwood, 1995) pp. 401–5.

External links

Regeringen Poul Schlüter I (First Government of Poul Schlüter) — Statsministeriet (Prime Minister's Office)
Regeringen Poul Schlüter II (Second Government of Poul Schlüter) — Statsministeriet
Regeringen Poul Schlüter III (Third Government of Poul Schlüter) — Statsministeriet
Regeringen Poul Schlüter IV (Fourth Government of Poul Schlüter) — Statsministeriet

1929 births
2021 deaths
Danish Lutherans
Danish Justice Ministers
Prime Ministers of Denmark
University of Copenhagen alumni
Members of the Folketing
Grand Crosses of the Order of the Dannebrog
Commanders Grand Cross of the Order of the Polar Star
Conservatism in Denmark
Recipients of Nersornaat
20th-century Danish politicians
People from Tønder Municipality
Recipients of the Order of the Cross of Terra Mariana, 1st Class
Leaders of the Conservative People's Party (Denmark)